UZSCINET (Uzbekistan Scientific Network) is a national research laboratory in Uzbekistan.

References

External links
 

National research and education networks
Supercomputer sites